Ogun may refer to:

Ogun (also referred to as Ogún or Ogúm), an Orisha
Ogun River, a river in southwestern Nigeria
Ogun State, a state in southwestern Nigeria
Ogun Records, a record label
Ogun (Marvel Comics), a comic book character.

See also
Ogün, Turkish name